Alan Osborne Trounson  (born 16 February 1946) is an Australian embryologist with expertise in stem cell research. Trounson was the President of the California Institute for Regenerative Medicine between 2007 and 2014, a former Professor of Stem Cell Sciences and the Director of the Monash Immunology and Stem Cell Laboratories at Monash University, and retains the title of emeritus professor.

Trounson's areas of interest include cloning, stem cells, biotechnology, cloning for agricultural industry, gene storage and in-vitro fertilisation.

Background and early career
Trounson graduated from the University of New South Wales in 1971 with a Master of Science in Wool and Pastoral Sciences. In 1974 he was awarded his PhD in animal embryology by the University of Sydney. Between 1971 and 1976 Trounson was the Dalgety Research Fellow at the Australian Research Council Institute of Animal Physiology and Biochemistry at Cambridge University. Returning to Australia in 1977, he was appointed Senior Research Fellow at Monash University.

Career
Trounson introduced two world-first procedures which greatly improved the success rate of in-vitro fertilisation (IVF). They were the use of a fertility drug to induce multiple ova and the freezing of embryos for future use. These procedures enabled more than 300,000 women worldwide to conceive successfully.

Trounson made headlines in 1980 with the first IVF birth in Australia and afterwards set up the Monash team of Carl Wood, Trounson, John Leeton, J.Mc.K. Talbot and Gab Kovacs. He was appointed a Reader in the Department of Obstetrics and Gynecology in 1984 and the following year the Director of the Centre for Early Human Development. In 1991 he was appointed a Personal Chair in Obstetrics and Gynaecology/Paediatrics at Monash University and was awarded the Wellcome (Australia) Medal. Further awards followed in 1994 and 1994 when he received the Patrick Steptoe Memorial Medal from the British Fertility Society, and the Benjamin Henry Sheares Medal from the Obstetrical and Gynaecological Society, Singapore.

In 2000, he again made international headlines when he led the team which discovered that nerve stem cells could be derived from embryonic stem cells. This announcement led to a dramatic increase in interest in the potential of stem cells to cure a range of currently incurable diseases. In 2002, Tounson apologised for misleading members of the Australian Parliament by attributing the recovery of a crippled rat to embryonic stem cells, when in fact the cells were germ cells from a fetal rat.

In 2003 he was appointed a Personal Chair as Professor of Stem Cell Sciences at Monash University, was awarded a Doctor Honoris Causa by the Faculties of Medical Sciences and Physical Education and Physiotherapy, Vrije Universiteit Brussel, Brussels, Belgium, and was named Australian Humanist of the Year.

Trounson was the founder and executive vice-chairman of the National Biotechnology Centre of Excellence, Australian Stem Cell Centre, as well as Global Scientific Strategy Advisor.

He serves on the Science Advisory Board of the Genetics Policy Institute and was a founder of the Australian Stem Cell Centre.

In 2007 he was appointed President of the California Institute for Regenerative Medicine, a position he held until his return to Australia in 2014.

In 2008 Trounson was inducted as an Honorary Member in the Monash University Golden Key Society.

Trounson was appointed an Officer of the Order of Australia for "distinguished service to medical science, and to in vitro fertilisation and stem cell technologies" in the 2021 Queen's Birthday Honours.

Books

Articles

References

External links
 
 
 

Australian medical researchers
Australian geneticists
Academic staff of Monash University
Academics of the University of Cambridge
University of New South Wales alumni
University of Sydney alumni
Living people
Place of birth missing (living people)
1946 births
Fellows of the Australian Academy of Technological Sciences and Engineering
Officers of the Order of Australia